Chuck is a masculine given name or a nickname for Charles or Charlie. It may refer to:

People

Arts and entertainment
 Chuck Alaimo, American saxophonist, leader of the Chuck Alaimo Quartet
 Chuck Barris (1929–2017), American TV producer
 Chuck Berry (1926–2017), American rock and roll musician
 Chuck Brown (1936–2012), American guitarist and singer
 Chuck Close (born 1940), American painter and photographer
 Chuck Comeau (born 1979), Canadian drummer
 Chuck D (born 1960), stage name of Carlton Douglas Ridenhour, American rapper
 Chuck Garric, rock bassist of Alice Cooper
 Charlton Heston, "Chuck", (1923–2008), American actor and political activist
 Chuck Holmes (entrepreneur) (1945–2000), American entrepreneur and philanthropist, founded Falcon Studios
 Chuck Jones (1912–2002), American animator, screenwriter, producer, and director of animated films
 Chuck Leavell (born 1952), American pianist and keyboardist
 Chuck Lorre (born 1952), American television writer, director, producer, composer, and production manager
 Chuck Mangione (born 1940), American flugelhorn player and composer
 Chuck Norris (born 1940), American martial artist, actor and media personality
 Chuck Palahniuk (born 1962), American novelist and freelance journalist
 Chuck Schuldiner (1967–2001), American singer, songwriter, and guitarist
 Chuck Traynor (1937–2002), American pornographer
 Charles F. Walker, American historian
 Chuck Willis (1928–58), American blues singer and songwriter
 Chuck Woolery (born 1941), American actor, singer and game show host

Sports
 Chuck Bennett (1907–1973), American football player and coach
 Chuck Carney (1900–1984), American football and basketball player
 Chuck Clark (born 1995), American football player
 Chuck Clements (born 1973), American football player
 Chuck Cooper (basketball), (1926–1984), American basketball player
 Chuck Detwiler (born 1947), American football player
 Chuck Dressen (1898–1966), an American third baseman, manager and coach in professional baseball
 Chuck Drulis (1918–1972), American football player and coach
 Chuck Ealey (born 1950), American Canadian football player
 Chuck Fusina (born 1957), American college and professional football player
 Chuck Gelatka (1914–2001), American football player
 Chuck Hulse (1927–2020), American racing driver
 Chuck Hutchison (born 1948), American football player
 Chuck Lanza (born 1964), American football player
 Chuck Liddell (born 1969), American mixed martial artist and former UFC champion
 Chuck Long (born 1963), American football coach
 Chuck McKinley (1941–1986), American men's amateur tennis player
 Chuck Noll (1932–2014), American football coach
 Chuck Osborne (American football) (1973–2012), American football player 
 Chuck Taylor (American football), American football player and coach
 Chuck Taylor (salesman) (1901–1969), American basketball player and shoe salesman/evangelist
 Chuck Taylor (baseball) (1942–2018), American baseball pitcher and player
 Chuck Wepner (born 1939), American heavyweight boxer
 Chuck Weatherspoon (born 1968), American football player

Politics
 Chuck Fager (born 1942), American activist, author, editor, publisher, and prominent member of the Religious Society of Friends
 Chuck Grassley (born 1933), senior United States senator from Iowa, serving since 1981
 Chuck Hagel (born 1946), United States Secretary of Defense, February 27, 2013 to February 13, 2015
 Chuck Schumer (born 1950), politician, and senior United States senator from New York, serving since 1999

Other
 Chuck Hull (born 1939), inventor of 3D printing
 Chuck Testa (born 1956), American taxidermist
 Chuck Yeager (1923–2020), retired brigadier general in the United States Air Force and record-setting test pilot
Charles W. Mooney Jr., American, the Charles A. Heimbold, Jr. Professor of Law, and former interim Dean, at the University of Pennsylvania Law School

Fictional characters

 Chuck, a character in the 1985 American adventure comedy film Pee-wee's Big Adventure
 Chuck Billy (Chuck Billy 'n' Folks), a character from Monica's Gang and Chuck Billy 'n' Folks
 Chuck E. Cheese, Anthropomorphic restaurant mascot
 Chuck Bartowski, main character of the American television show Chuck
 Chuck (Pokémon), a character in the Pokémon universe
 Chuck, a character from Kodomo no Jikan, a Japanese manga series
 Chuck, a character from Panty & Stocking with Garterbelt, a Japanese anime television series
 Chuck Greene, protagonist of Dead Rising 2
 Chuck (Stargate), a character from the Stargate television series
 Charlotte "Chuck" Charles, a character from the television series Pushing Daisies
 Chuck Bass, a character from the television series Gossip Girl
 Chuck, a male, triangular-shaped yellow canary in the Angry Birds games
 Chuck Cunningham, a character from the sitcom Happy Days
 Chuck Chambers, a character from iCarly
 Chuck McCoy, a character from Austin & Ally
 Chuck McGill, a character from the American television series Better Call Saul
 Chuck Miller, a character in the American teen romantic comedy 1987 movie Can't Buy Me Love 
 Chuck Pearson, a character in 1989 American independent coming of age comedy movie She's Out of Control
 Chuck Rhoades, a character from the American television series Billions
 Polly Chuck, a character in the anime television series Fables of the Green Forest
 Not Chuck, a character referred to as 'Chuck' by Lightning McQueen in Cars

See also
 Chucky (name)
 Chucky (disambiguation)
 Chuckles (disambiguation)
 Charlie (disambiguation)
 Charley (disambiguation)
 Charles (disambiguation)
 Chuckii Booker
 Chuckey Charles

English masculine given names
English-language masculine given names
Hypocorisms